Heathdale Christian College is an independent, non-denominational, Christian, co-educational school in Werribee, in the western suburbs of Melbourne, Victoria, Australia.

Heathdale Werribee Campus offers classes for students at all levels, kindergarten to VCE (Victorian Certificate of Education). The college also offers Vocational Education and Training (VET) and Victorian Certificate of Applied Learning (VCAL) to Year 11 and 12 students.

The current total student enrolment is 1750 (across 2 campuses), with over 200 teaching and non-teaching staff. Most students reside in the western suburbs of Melbourne. The current principal of Heathdale Christian College is Mr Ross Grace.

The school has a co-curricular program that includes activities such as debating, public speaking, Battle of the Bands, general knowledge competitions, spelling bees, choral competitions, outdoor education and various sports. The senior year levels (9-12) have the opportunity to compete in a yearly inter-school sports and cultural competition with Tyndale Christian School to win the "Dale Cup", while Year 8 students have the opportunity to compete in a yearly inter-school sports and cultural competition with King's College.

Heathdale Christian College has two campuses in Werribee and in Melton, Victoria. This school commenced in 2014 with students in Prep to Year 4 and has now grown to accept students from Prep to Year 7.

House system 
Students are divided into one of four houses upon enrolling for the college. These houses compete every year in different academic and sporting events. Each house is named after a notable missionary.

 Carey, named after William Carey
 Judson, named after Adoniram Judson
 Stanway, named after Alfred Stanway
 Taylor, named after Hudson Taylor

References

External links
 Official website

Schools in Wyndham
Secondary schools in Melbourne
Educational institutions established in 1982
1982 establishments in Australia
Werribee, Victoria
Buildings and structures in the City of Melton